The year 1739 in science and technology involved some significant events.

Earth sciences
 Plinian eruption of Mount Tarumae volcano in Japan.

Exploration
 January 1 – Bouvet Island is discovered by French explorer Jean-Baptiste Charles Bouvet de Lozier in the South Atlantic Ocean.

Mathematics
 Leonhard Euler solves the general homogeneous linear ordinary differential equation with constant coefficients.
 Euler invents the tonnetz (German for "tone-network"), a conceptual lattice diagram that shows a two-dimensional tonal pitch space created by the network of relationships between musical pitches in just intonation.

Physics
 Émilie du Châtelet publishes Dissertation sur la nature et la propagation du feu.

Awards
 Copley Medal: Stephen Hales

Societies
 June 2 – The Royal Swedish Academy of Sciences is founded in Stockholm by Linnaeus, Mårten Triewald and others.

Births
 November 14 – William Hewson, English surgeon, anatomist and physiologist, "father of haematology" (died 1774)
 December 14 – Pierre Samuel du Pont de Nemours, French industrialist (died 1817)
 Israel Lyons, English mathematician and botanist (died 1775)

Deaths
 April 19 – Nicholas Saunderson, English scientist and mathematician (born 1682)
 April 27 – Nicolas Sarrabat, French scientist, astronomer and mathematician (born 1698)

References

 
18th century in science
1730s in science